This is a list of notable Christian singers, who were either citizens or residents of Brazil, or published the bulk of their work while living there.

A 

 Rodolfo Abrantes (born 1972)
 Lu Alone (born 1993)

B 

 Aline Barros (born 1976)
 Fernanda Brum (born 1976)

C 

 Cassiane (born 1973)
 Caroline Celico (born 1988)

D 

 Damares (born 1980)
 Diante do Trono

F 

 Ludmila Ferber (born 1965)
 Marine Friesen (born 1988)

M 

 Cristina Mel (born 1964)
 Soraya Moraes (born 1973)

N 

 Mattos Nascimento (born 1954)
 Nelson Ned (1947–2014)
 Ana Nóbrega (born 1980)

O 

 Oficina G3

P 

 Perlla (born 1988)

R 

 Gabriela Rocha (born 1994)
 Deise Rosa (born 1974)

S 

 Davi Sacer (born 1975)
 Israel Salazar (born 1990)
 Sarah Sheeva (born 1973)
 Nívea Soares (born 1976)
 Juliano Son (born 1978)

T 

 Trazendo a Arca

V 

 Ana Paula Valadão (born 1976)
 André Valadão (born 1978)
 Mariana Valadão (born 1984)

See also 

 Brazilian music
 Contemporary Christian music
 Contemporary worship music
 List of singers
 List of televangelists in Brazil
 :Category:Brazilian gospel singers

References 

Christian
+
Singers
Lists of performers of Christian music
Lists of singers by nationality